Diocese of Kigali may refer to:
 Anglican Diocese of Kigali
 Roman Catholic Archdiocese of Kigali